Josip Biskić (born 20 May 1959, in Croatia) is a retired Australian Association football player who played for National Soccer League club Melbourne Knights, Malaysian club Selangor FA, and Victorian Premier League clubs Heidelberg United and the Fawkner Blues. After his retirement from playing he moved into coaching.

Biskic  is most known for his time at the Melbourne Knights, playing 282 NSL games for the club. He was one of the league's standout players, winning the NSL's player of the year in 1991/92 winning the Johnny Warren Medal, as well as winning the Joe Marston Medal with his man of the match performance in the 1990/91 NSL Grand Final.

He was named as Vice Captain in the Melbourne Knights' Team of the Half Century

References

External links
 Oz Football profile
 Nostalgia Liga Malaysia: Josip Biskic

1959 births
Living people
Croatian emigrants to Australia
Australian soccer players
National Soccer League (Australia) players
Melbourne Knights FC players
Selangor FA players
Expatriate footballers in Malaysia
NK Osijek players
Association football midfielders
Melbourne Knights FC managers